Ixora malabarica is a species of flowering plant in the family Rubiaceae. It is native to Karnataka and Kerala in India.

References

External links
World Checklist of Rubiaceae

malabarica
Flora of Karnataka
Flora of Kerala
Vulnerable plants
Taxonomy articles created by Polbot